is a district located in Osaka Prefecture, Japan.

Town
Shimamoto

Districts in Osaka Prefecture